is a railway station located in the city of Fukushima, Fukushima Prefecture, Japan operated by Fukushima Transportation. Iwashiroshimizu is unique in that it is the last remaining station to be named after the former Iwashiro Province. In 1965 Iwashiro-Atami Station, at the time on the JNR's Ban'etsu West Line, was renamed to Bandai-Atami Station. With the 1972 closure of the Kawamate Line, Iwashiro-Iino Station and Iwashiro-Kawamata Station were shut down. This leaves Iwashiroshimizu as the final station bearing the name of the former province.

Lines

Station layout
Iwashiroshimizu Station has one above-ground side platform serving a single bi-directional track. It is staffed in the morning and evening on non-holiday weekdays. There is a proof-of-departure ticket machine and a beverage vending machine located at the station.

Adjacent stations

History
It was renamed to its present name on December 29, 1944.

Surrounding area

See also
 List of railway stations in Japan

References

External links

  

Railway stations in Japan opened in 1925
Railway stations in Fukushima Prefecture
Fukushima Kōtsū Iizaka Line
Fukushima (city)